Aster Aweke (born 1959) is an Ethiopian singer who sings in Amharic. Aster's voice has attracted broader public popularity, especially tracing back in 1990s singles and her single "Abebayehosh" in Ethiopian New Year. She is best known for her 1999 album Hagere and her 2006 album Fikir. She moved to the United States in 1981, and she returned to Ethiopia in 1997.

Early life
Born in Gondar in 1959. She moved to Addis Ababa as a child with her father, who was senior civil servant in the imperial government of Haile Selassie.  Aster hails from the Amhara ethnic group. 
 
In a 1990 interview with Amy Duncan of The Christian Science Monitor, Aster told the opposition of her music ambition from her parents: "My family opposed me, but i just kept going and going....That's my life. I tried everything, but music makes me so happy."

Career
Aster enjoyed listening musicians like Tilahun Gessesse and Bizunesh Bekele, and Donna Summer and Aretha Franklin from outside. When she was thirteen years-old, she decided to join Hager Fikir Theatre and auditioned by singing Bizunesh's song to join the theater as a dancer and vocalist.

In her teen years, she performed through clubs at Addis Ababa with famous bands including Shebelle Band, Roha Band, Ibex Band and Hotel D'Afrique Band. Her style gradually influenced by Bizunesh Bekele and performed songs by Donna Summer and Aretha Franklin. She began as a solo career in 1977 through the release of her debut album, and followed with three more albums within the year.

In 1981, she moved to the United States. She temporarily settled in the San Francisco Bay Area of California and then within two years moved to Washington, D.C. She briefly attended Northern Virginia Community College, specializing in computer science, as well as learning formal musical education, which she took a distaste towards. During her time in the D.C. metropolitan area, she performed in restaurants and clubs. During her time in Washington, Aster released her U.S. major label debut Aster. Aster was released by Columbia Records in 1990 after a 1989 release by British independent label Triple Earth.

In 1997, after more than 15 years abroad, Aster returned to Ethiopia, where she was warmly welcomed by thousands of fans awaiting her at Addis Ababa airport.

Aster Aweke owned and operated a cafeteria in Addis Ababa called Kabu, which was named after her song "Kabu". The cafeteria ceased operations in 2015. On 3 January 2023, Aster released Soba. The album comprises a collabrative work of other artists.

Discography

Contributing artist
Ethiopian Groove (1994) - The Golden Seventies (Buda Musique)
Unwired: Acoustic Music from Around the World (1999) - (World Music Network)
The Rough Guide to the Music of Ethiopia (2004) - (World Music Network)

Featured singles
 Taitu (2014) - Yegna

References

External links
Abesha.com - Aster's Ballad's (Review)
[ Allmusic - Aster Aweke]
 African Legends Aster Aweke World Music
Sheger Video - Ethiopian Music and Fun Videos
Africanmusiciansprofiles.com - Aster Aweke
zefen.com - Aster Aweke 
Interview with Aster Aweke

1959 births
Living people
Buda Musique artists
Columbia Records artists
Ethiopian emigrants to the United States
20th-century Ethiopian women singers
Musicians from Addis Ababa
People from Gondar
21st-century Ethiopian women singers